is a station on the Tama Toshi Monorail Line in Tachikawa, Tokyo, Japan.

Lines
Takamatsu Station is served by the Tama Toshi Monorail Line, and is located 4.2 kilometers from the northern terminus of the line at Kamikitadai Station.

Station layout
Takamatsu Station is a raised station with two tracks and two opposed side platforms, with the station building located underneath.

Platforms

History
The station opened on November 27, 1998.

Station numbering was introduced in February 2018 with Takamatsu being assigned TT13.

Surrounding area
The station is above Tokyo Metropolitan Route 43 and is surrounded by warehouses and a driving range. Northwest of the station lies the Tama Toshi Monorail's maintenance facility and railyard, as well as the company headquarters. Other points of interest include:
 Showa Memorial Park
 National Institute for Japanese Language and Linguistics
 National Institute of Japanese Literature
 Institute of Statistical Mathematics
 National Institute of Polar Research
 Tokyo District Court Tachikawa Branch Court
 Tachikawa Second Judicial Building
 Local Autonomy College
 National Hospital Organization Disaster Medical Center
 Tachikawa Police Station

See also
 List of railway stations in Japan

References

External links

 Tama Monorail Takamatsu Station 

Railway stations in Japan opened in 1998
Railway stations in Tokyo
Tama Toshi Monorail
Tachikawa, Tokyo